Nikita Vladimirovich Yershov (born 17 September 2002) is a Russian football player who plays for FC Irtysh Omsk on loan from FC Fakel Voronezh.

Club career
He made his debut for FC Fakel Voronezh on 29 September 2022 in a Russian Cup game against PFC Krylia Sovetov Samara. He made his Russian Premier League debut for Fakel on 28 October 2022 against FC Orenburg.

On 22 February 2023, Yershov moved on loan to FC Irtysh Omsk until the end of the season.

Career statistics

References

External links
 
 
 
 

2002 births
People from Shebekino
Sportspeople from Belgorod Oblast
Living people
Russian footballers
Association football midfielders
FC Salyut Belgorod players
FC Fakel Voronezh players
FC Irtysh Omsk players
Russian Premier League players
Russian Second League players